Reece Bougton (born 1 July 1995) is an English professional rugby union player who plays for Gloucester. He is currently dual-registered with Cinderford R.F.C.

References

Living people
1995 births
English rugby union players
Gloucester Rugby players
Rugby union players from Gloucester
Rugby union scrum-halves